Dămienești is a commune in Bacău County, Western Moldavia, Romania. It is composed of four villages: Călugăreni, Dămienești, Drăgești and Pădureni.

Natives
 Dumitru Berbece

References

Communes in Bacău County
Localities in Western Moldavia